Robert William Herbeck is an actor, film producer and screenwriter, known for writing the first Teenage Mutant Ninja Turtles film.

Career

Actor
Herbeck had a television acting career in the 1970s and 1980s. His roles were credited in several television series including Mash, CHiPs Diff'rent Strokes, and The Jeffersons.

Producer
In 1998 Herbeck was listed as a co-producer on the Warner Brothers movie Wrongfully Accused.

Writer
Herbeck was a comedy writer when he came up with the idea of creating a Teenage Mutant Ninja Turtles film in 1988. The film had a 25 Million dollar opening weekend which surprised many Hollywood insiders.

Herbeck wrote the first screenplay of Teenage Mutant Ninja Turtles.  Screenwriter Todd W. Langen was called in to do a "Page One rewrite," that is, a complete revision based on a screenplay that a studio had deemed interesting but unworkable as submitted.  Langen and Herbeck did not work together and did not meet until the film opened.  Langen is credited first.

Lawsuit
In 2015 Herbeck and others filed a 3 million dollar lawsuit against the Franchise rights holder (Fortune Star Media) for the Teenage Mutant Ninja Turtles. The writers and the directors claimed Fortune Star Media would not pay them. Herbeck claimed that Fortune Star Media owed him $250,000.

References

External links
 

1945 births
Living people
American male screenwriters
Place of birth missing (living people)
20th-century American male actors
21st-century American male actors
American male television actors
American film producers
Writers from Los Angeles
Screenwriters from California